Andrew Leslie may refer to:

 Andrew Leslie (footballer), Scottish footballer
 Andrew Leslie (general) (born 1957), retired Canadian Forces lieutenant-general; Canadian politician

 Andrew Leslie (shipbuilder) (1818–?), Scottish shipbuilder
 Andrew Leslie, 5th Earl of Rothes (died 1611), Scottish nobleman
 Andy Leslie (born 1944), New Zealand footballer
 Andy Leslie (footballer)